Superficial spreading melanoma (SSM) is usually characterized as the most common form of cutaneous melanoma in Caucasians. The average age at diagnosis is in the fifth decade, and it tends to occur on sun-exposed skin, especially on the backs of males and lower limbs of females.

Signs and symptoms
Often, this disease evolves from a precursor lesion, usually a dysplastic nevus.  Otherwise it arises in previously normal skin.  A prolonged radial growth phase, where the lesion remains thin, may eventually be followed by a vertical growth phase where the lesion becomes thick and nodular.  As the risk of spread varies with the thickness, early SSM is more frequently cured than late nodular melanoma.

Histopathology
The microscopic hallmarks are:
 Large melanocytic cells with nest formation along the dermo-epidermal junction.
 Invasion of the upper epidermis in a pagetoid fashion (discohesive single cell growth).
 The pattern of rete ridges is often effaced.
 Invasion of the dermis by atypical, pleomorphic melanocytes
 Absence of the 'maturation' typical of naevus cells
 Mitoses

Treatment
Treatment is by excisional biopsy, wide local excision and possibly sentinel node biopsy.  Localized melanoma, which has not spread beyond the skin, has a very good prognosis with low recurrence rates. Spread of disease to local lymph nodes or distant sites (typically brain, bone, skin and lung) marks a decidedly poor prognosis.

See also 
 Melanoma
 List of cutaneous conditions

References

External links 

 Fact File from the Royal College of Pathologists of Australasia (pdf)

Melanoma